Omphalucha is a genus of moths in the family Geometridae described by Warren in 1905.

Species
Omphalucha albosignata Janse, 1932
Omphalucha angulilinea (Janse, 1932)
Omphalucha apira L. B. Prout, 1938
Omphalucha brunnea (Warren, 1899)
Omphalucha crenulata (Warren, 1897)
Omphalucha ditriba L. B. Prout, 1938
Omphalucha epixyna L. B. Prout, 1938
Omphalucha exocholoxa L. B. Prout, 1938
Omphalucha hirta Warren, 1905
Omphalucha indeflexa L. B. Prout, 1922
Omphalucha indigna (L. B. Prout, 1915)
Omphalucha katangae  L. B. Prout, 1934
Omphalucha maturnaria (Möschler, 1884)
Omphalucha natalensis Herbulot, 1995
Omphalucha nubimedia L. B. Prout, 1938
Omphalucha praeses L. B. Prout, 1938
Omphalucha prosciodes (L. B. Prout, 1934)
Omphalucha ruandana Herbulot, 1997
Omphalucha rufinubes Warren, 1905

References

Warren (1905). "New African Thyrididae, Uraniidae, and Geometridae". Novitates Zoologicae. 12: 380–409.

Ennominae